Arachidonyl-2'-chloroethylamide (ACEA) is a synthetic agonist of the CB1 (CB1R). ACEA is considered to be a selective cannabinoid agonist as it binds primarily to the CB1R and has low affinity to the CB2 (CB2R) (Ki = 1.4 nM for CB1R; Ki = 3100 nM for CB2R).

References

Lipids
Cannabinoids
Fatty acid amides
Arachidonyl compounds